Beverley Ann Mitchell (born January 22, 1981) is an American actress and country music singer. She portrayed Lucy Camden on the television series 7th Heaven.

Early life 
In 1999, Mitchell graduated from Chaminade College Preparatory School and then began studying film production at Loyola Marymount University.

Career

Mitchell's first major film role was at age 15 in The Crow: City of Angels, playing teenaged drug addict Grace. During the filming of the 1996 movie, she unsuccessfully auditioned for the role of Mary Camden in the new family drama, 7th Heaven. She then read for the part of sister Lucy and was cast.

In 2000, Mitchell had a small part in The Amanda Show as a customer in Moody's Point. In 2003, she played Erica Enders-Stevens in the Disney Channel original movie Right on Track, based on the early career of the 2014 NHRA Mello Yello Drag Racing Series Pro Stock champion and her sister Courtney Enders, who was played by Brie Larson. During a hiatus from filming 7th Heaven in 2005, Mitchell played Laura Hunter in the horror sequel Saw 2. In 2006, she recorded her debut, self-titled country album. She co-wrote eight of the songs featured on the album, including "Angel", which is about her friend who was killed in a car accident when the two were teenagers. Mitchell starred in the 2007 TV movie I Know What I Saw, which aired on the Lifetime network.

In 2010, Mitchell took on the role of school counselor Katelyn O’Malley on the third season of The Secret Life of the American Teenager. In March 2016, she was cast in the Pop Hollywood Darlings with fellow 1990s child stars Jodie Sweetin and Christine Lakin. The series premiered April 12, 2017.

Personal life 
Mitchell married her long time boyfriend Michael Cameron on October 1, 2008 in Ravello, Italy on the Amalfi Coast. Former 7th Heaven castmates Jessica Biel and Mackenzie Rosman served as bridesmaids. They have a son and two daughters.

Filmography

Television

Film

Discography

Awards and nominations 

Young Artist Awards
1997: Best Performance in a Drama Series – Young Actress (7th Heaven) – Won
1998: Best Performance in a TV Drama Series – Leading Young Actress (7th Heaven) – Won
1999: Best Performance in a TV Series – Young Ensemble (7th Heaven) – Nominated (with Barry Watson, David Gallagher, Jessica Biel and Mackenzie Rosman)
2000: Best Performance in a TV Drama Series – Leading Young Actress (7th Heaven) – Won

Teen Choice Awards
2005: Choice TV Actress: Drama (7th Heaven) – Nominated

YoungStar Awards
1998: Best Performance by a Young Actress in a Drama TV Series (7th Heaven) – Nominated
2000: Best Young Ensemble Cast – Television (7th Heaven) – Nominated (with David Gallagher, Jessica Biel and Mackenzie Rosman)

References

External links 

20th-century American actresses
21st-century American actresses
Actresses from Los Angeles
American child actresses
American country singer-songwriters
American women country singers
American film actresses
American television actresses
Living people
Loyola Marymount University alumni
Singer-songwriters from California
People from Greater Los Angeles
21st-century American singers
21st-century American women singers
Country musicians from California
Chaminade College Preparatory School (California) alumni
1981 births